Getting Nowhere Fast is a BBC Radio sitcom written by and starring the comedian and musician Mervyn Stutter.

Stutter plays "Merv" the co-owner and manager of "The Cyber Pass", a former "vodka'n'veggies" bistro converted into an Internet Cafe.  Actress Lill Roughley plays Pamela Baverstock, Merv's ex-wife and the other co-owner of the bistro.  Pamela's rich property-developer husband Dominic keeps her in a fine house, in the front garden of which Merv lives in a small caravan.  Dominic is never heard from directly, but constantly phones Pamela on her mobile, although he has trouble remembering who she is, so busy is he with his international business interests.  Pamela married Dominic after Merv left to pursue a career as a rock musician, leaving her in charge of the bistro they opened together while still a couple.

The action of the show revolves around the relationship between Pamela and Merv, with many distractions from the surreal characters who frequent the bistro.  Much use is made of character catchphrases to elicit audience reaction.  Musical links by Stutter comment on the plot.

Characters
 Merv (Mervyn Stutter) impoverished former would-be rock musician and now manager of "The Cyber Pass".
 Pamela (Lill Roughley), Merv's ex-wife living in the lap of luxury.  Always answers her mobile phone with "Baverstock!".
 Neville Dilkes (Martin Freeman in series 1, Gyuri Sarossy in series 2 and 3), a 28-year-old teenager and would-be cool dude who in fact still lives with his parents.  He is in charge of the computer hardware in the bistro.  He always enters with the exclamation "Yo, Mr. Stutter dude!  Neville is in the building!  Everybody in the house say whoa-oh!  Everybody in the house say hey, hey!".  Silence always follows.
 Chantal (Tracy-Ann Oberman), a "South African hottie" who works at the bistro, when she can tear herself away from her soft-porn website, and her various plastic surgeons, personal trainers and lifestyle consultants etc.  At least once an episode she relates her latest sexual encounter including the words "I had a complete cadenza!".
 P.C. Alan Dilkes (Christopher Ettridge in series 1, Michael Mears in series 2 and 3), Neville's father and the local community policeman.  He always enters with the words "Move along, move along, there's nothing to see."  He and Mrs. Dilkes belong to some unusual clubs.  They spend every other weekend with Oglala Sioux Tribute Tribe.
 Dibden Purlew (John Challis), an ageing, out-of-work actor and lush.  He is always looking for a free drink, and seems to be kept around purely for entertainment value.  He will usually offer witty commentary on the current situation, followed by a call for "applause, cheers, flies etc.".  The audience always responds.  The film "Neasden Cosh Boys (1955)", in which he appeared, happens to be P.C. and Mrs. Dilkes' favourite film.
 Edith Figgis (Lill Roughley),  71-year-old cook, maintenance person, rock-and-roller and admirer of all things male.  She leads the local "Pensioner Posse Commune" and plays with the band "The Swinging Blue Veins".

References

External links
 
 Getting Nowhere Fast at epguides.com
 Website for Mervyn Stutter

BBC Radio comedy programmes
2001 radio programme debuts